The Party for People with Special Needs was a minor political party in Ontario, Canada, founded in 2007 and having contested the 2007 provincial election. The party ran two candidates, leader Danish Ahmed in Toronto Centre and John Rubino in Trinity—Spadina, neither of whom won.

PPSN was founded following a rule change regarding official party recognition; parties were required to only field two candidates to be registered, as opposed to the previous requirement of running candidates in half of all electoral districts.
The party's mandate was to focus on the needs of people with disabilities. The party failed to win any seats in the 2022 Ontario general election. 

The party's website was last updated in August 2015, and has since gone offline.

Election results

Notes

External links
 Party for People with Special Needs (copy archived March 2021)

Provincial political parties in Ontario
Disability politics